Vitaly Serhiyovych Konov (born 13 July 1987) is a Ukrainian badminton player.

Achievements

BWF International Challenge/Series 
Men's singles

Men's doubles

Mixed doubles

  BWF International Challenge tournament
  BWF International Series tournament
  BWF Future Series tournament

References

External links 
 

Living people
1987 births
People from Priozersk
Ukrainian male badminton players